The GDC Observatory is an astronomical observatory dedicated to the exploration and science of the night sky. Located in Gingin, Western Australia, the observatory is a part of the Gingin Gravity Precinct. The Observatory is open to the public on a regular basis.

Southern Cross Cosmos Centre

The observatory is located in the Southern Cross Cosmos Centre, a purpose built facility opened in 2001, with a slide-off roof housing five telescopes available for public use on astronomical viewing nights.

The largest telescope is a  Obsession telescope named "Brodie-Hall", donated to the observatory by Jean Brodie-Hall on behalf of the late Laurence Brodie-Hall.

The facility is located next-door to the Zadko telescope run by the University of Western Australia, which is actively involved in scientific research.

See also 
 List of astronomical observatories
 List of astronomical societies
 Lists of telescopes

References

External links
 

Astronomical observatories in Western Australia
Public observatories
Education in Western Australia
Wheatbelt (Western Australia)
Astronomy museums